Kozhikode Beach or Calicut Beach is a beach on the western side of Kozhikode, situated on the Malabar Coast of India. The beach is accessible through four road overbridges in the city. The beach has paved stones and illumination.  There is one Lions Park for the children and an aquarium.  Kozhikode beach has always been a prominent place for conducting public meetings.  The beach road was renamed 'Gandhi Road' in 1934 after Gandhi visited Calicut in 1934.

History
100 years ago Valiyangadi and the beach area were the centre of Kozhikode city.  In the 1970s the downtown shifted to Mananchira area and again, in the 1980s, Mavoor Road became the centre of attraction.  In 2010s, Thondayad Bypass area and Palazhi on the Airport road has emerged as the new city centre with a vibrant night life.

Important landmarks

 Barami Masjidh
 Santhwanam NGO, Cherootty Road
 Gandhi Peace Foundation, Cherootty Road
 All India Radio, Beach Road
 Corporation Office, Beach
 Thodiyil Shree Bhagawathy Temple
 Gurajathi School, Gujarathi Street
 St.Josephs Boys School
 District Court, Kozhikode
St.Josephs AIGHSS, Convent Road
Sea Queen Hotel 
Beach Hotel 
Sree Thiruvani Bhagavathi Temple, Moonalingal 
Government General Hospital, Beach Hospital 
Hotel Neerayi
Merchant Navy Club
The Marine Research Aquarium, CMFRI, Beach Road
Crescent Mervue Apartments
Maha Ganapathi Bhuvaneshwari Temple, Puthiya Kadavu, Beach Road
Kamburam Bhagavathy Temple
Vellayil Police Station, Beach Road
Vellayil Fishing Harbour 
Appolo Sea Breeze Apartments,Beach Road,

The 28-km beach road
Kozhikode Beach has a long drive from Beypore in the south to Kappad in the north.  
The following beaches are part of Kozhikode Beach: 
 Beypore, Payyanakkal and Marad
 Kallayi, Kuttichira and Thekkeppuram
 Vellayil, South Beach and Valiyangadi
 Kamburam, Putiyappa and Elathur
Konad, Bhat Road

Valiyangadi
On the southern side of the beach, Valiyangadi was the place where European and Arab traders brushed shoulders just a few centuries back.  There is one Gujarathi Street and a Halwa Street on the locality. The road towards the south reaches the Chakkum Kadavu bridge and has access to the Kallayi, Marad and Beypore beaches. Valiyanagdi have great past and history. We can see the value of valiyangadi in malabar history

Mishkal Masjidh

The Mishkal Masjidh is a four storied mosque at Kuttichira in Kozhikode city.  The mosque is about 700 years old.  Originally built of wood in five stories, the mosque was later rebuilt into the present four stories.  The mosque has 47 doors, 24 pillars decorated with carvings and a very big prayer hall that can accommodate 400 people.

Cherootty Road
The Road over bridge from Mananchira to the Kozhikode beach takes you to the Red Cross Road that terminates in the beach.  Cherootty road is one of the offshoots of the Red Cross Road that ends at Court Road near the Mathrubhumi newspaper office.  This is a major shopping area of the Kozhikode beach area with many branded clothing shops and branches of nationalized branches on either side of the road.  Gandhi Peace Foundation is maintaining an office there.  The convent road is a branch of the Cherootty Road.  Tagore Centenary Hall, Muslim League Office, Moonnalingal junction and the Beach Office are also connected to the Red Cross Road.  The Silk Street and the Court Road runs parallel to Cherootty Road.  The Silk Street has a Punjabi school, St.Joseph's school and Sidhi Durbar.  Further west of the Silk Street lies the beach road which runs north–south from Vellayil in the north to Chakkum Kadavu in the south.

Nalam Gate
Nalam Gate or the fourth gate is a posh shopping locality on P.T.Usha Road in Kozhikode city.  It is known as a foodie paradise because of the presence of a number of classy restaurants and coffee shops.

Image gallery

See also
 Kozhikode North
 Kozhikode South
 Kozhikode East

References

External links

Beaches of Kozhikode district
Tourist attractions in Kozhikode
Kozhikode beach